
Mielec County is a unit of territorial administration and local government (powiat) in Subcarpathian Voivodeship, south-eastern Poland. It came into being on January 1, 1999, as a result of the Polish local government reforms passed in 1998.

As of 30 VI 2019 its total population was 136,591, out of which the population of Mielec was 60,366, that of Radomyśl Wielki 3,231, and the rural population 72,994 (including approximately 1775 for the population of Przecław, which became a town in 2010).

Neighbouring counties
Mielec County is bordered by Staszów County and Tarnobrzeg County to the north, Kolbuszowa County to the east, Ropczyce-Sędziszów County and Dębica County to the south, and Dąbrowa County to the west.

Administrative division
The county is subdivided into 10 gminas (one urban, two urban-rural and seven rural). These are listed in the following table, in descending order of population.

References

Polish official population figures 2006

 
Mielec